Trenches is a Christian metal band, formed by Haste the Day vocalist, Jimmy Ryan. The band announced their hiatus in 2010 before getting back together in early 2012.

Background
Jimmy Ryan, a member of Haste the Day, at the time, decided to depart the band, when they were in Indianapolis, Indiana on December 30, 2005, doing a concert, where he is a native of the city. The group was formed, when Ryan selected Joel David Lauver to be a guitarist, keyboardist, and vocalist, Eli Larch Chastain to be a guitarist, Bill Scott to be a bassist, and Phil Hook to be their drummer.

Trenches commenced as a musical entity, in 2007, with their first studio album, The Tide Will Swallow Us Whole, that released on September 16, 2008, by Solid State Records. Their first concert occurred in the city of Noblesville, Indiana, on November 24, 2007. The band's national debut was during a performance at the Cornerstone Festival, the subsequent year. Trenches was to perform, in 2009, at the same festival, yet they were replaced on the lineup listing.

Since then, Hook and Chastain have left the band, and drummer, Zach Frizzell, joined the band. The band is currently working on a new album, titled, Reckoner.

On August 4, 2016, Trenches released an instrumental track, "The Death of All Mammoths", from the upcoming album, Reckoner.

Members

Current
 Jimmy Ryan – vocals (2007–2010, 2012–present)
 Bill Scott – bass (2007–2010, 2012–present)
 Joel David Lauver – guitars, vocals, programming, keyboards (2007–2010, 2012–present)
 Dyllen Jerome Nance – drums (2017–present)
 Ross Montgomery – guitars (2020–present)
 Carey Stilts – guitars (2020–present)

Former
 Phil Hook – drums (2007–2010, 2012–2013)
 Eli Larch Chastain – guitar (2007–2010, 2012–2014)
 Zach Frizzell – drums (2013–2015)

Session
Dave Powell – drums (Emery) (2013)

Discography
Studio albums
 The Tide Will Swallow Us Whole (September 16, 2008, Solid State)
 Reckoner (January 1, 2022)

Singles
 "The Death of All Mammoths" (August 4, 2016, Independent)

References

External links
 Trenches on Solid State Records

Musical groups from Indianapolis
2007 establishments in Indiana
Musical groups established in 2007
Musical groups disestablished in 2010
Musical groups reestablished in 2012
Musical quartets
Solid State Records artists
Heavy metal musical groups from Indiana
Metalcore musical groups from Indiana